Mead is a town in Bryan County, Oklahoma, United States. The population was 122 at the 2010 census, compared to 123 in 2000. Mead was originally named for C.W. Meade, the first postmaster, but the town later dropped the final "e" of the name.

Geography
Mead is located at  (34.001244, -96.510445).

Demographics

As of the census of 2000, there were 123 people, 49 households, and 29 families residing in the town. There were 64 housing units at an average density of 594.5 per square mile (224.6/km2). The racial makeup of the town was 79.67% White, 5.69% Native American, and 14.63% from two or more races. Hispanic or Latino of any race were 2.44% of the population.

There were 49 households, out of which 38.8% had children under the age of 18 living with them, 51.0% were married couples living together, 6.1% had a female householder with no husband present, and 38.8% were non-families. 34.7% of all households were made up of individuals, and 22.4% had someone living alone who was 65 years of age or older. The average household size was 2.51 and the average family size was 3.40.

In the town, the population was spread out, with 35.8% under the age of 18, 4.9% from 18 to 24, 30.1% from 25 to 44, 15.4% from 45 to 64, and 13.8% who were 65 years of age or older. The median age was 30 years. For every 100 females, there were 89.2 males. For every 100 females age 18 and over, there were 92.7 males.

The median income for a household in the town was $21,071, and the median income for a family was $23,125. Males had a median income of $29,167 versus $16,563 for females. The per capita income for the town was $9,697. There were 17.1% of families and 19.4% of the population living below the poverty line, including 20.6% of under eighteens and 13.8% of those over 64.

References

Towns in Bryan County, Oklahoma
Towns in Oklahoma